Pamela Mala Sinha is a Canadian actress and playwright. She is most noted for her 2012 one-woman show Crash, for which she won two Dora Mavor Moore Awards for Outstanding New Play and Outstanding Performance by a Female in a Principal Role – Play (Large Theatre). She was previously nominated as an actress in 2011 for her performance in Anusree Roy's Brothel #9.

Originally from Winnipeg, Manitoba, she wrote Crash based on her own experience having been sexually assaulted while attending theatre school in Montreal. She is currently based in Toronto, Ontario.

Sinha's second theatrical play, Happy Place, premiered at the Soulpepper Theatre Company in 2015. It was subsequently adapted by Helen Shaver for the 2020 film Happy Place, for which Sinha wrote the screenplay and performs the role of Rosemary.

On television, she has had recurring and supporting roles as Wanda in Street Legal, Rani in The Newsroom, Faith Colero in Traders, and desk clerk Amira in ER.

References

External links

21st-century Canadian actresses
21st-century Canadian dramatists and playwrights
21st-century Canadian screenwriters
21st-century Canadian women writers
Actresses from Winnipeg
Actresses from Toronto
Canadian film actresses
Canadian stage actresses
Canadian television actresses
Canadian women dramatists and playwrights
Canadian women screenwriters
Canadian writers of Asian descent
Canadian people of Indian descent
Dora Mavor Moore Award winners
Writers from Winnipeg
Writers from Toronto
Living people
Year of birth missing (living people)